Edward Beers may refer to:

Ed Beers (born 1959), Canadian ice hockey player
Edward M. Beers (1877–1932), American politician